James Ammon Ellisor (born March 9, 1990) is a professional basketball player for Benfica of the Liga Portuguesa de Basquetebol.

Before going to Portugal, James played for Glendale Gauchos and Bemidji State Beavers.

Honours
Oliveirense
 Portuguese League: 2017–18, 2018–19
 Portuguese League Cup: 2018–19
 Portuguese Supercup: 2018

References

1990 births
Living people
American expatriate basketball people in Portugal
American men's basketball players
Bemidji State Beavers men's basketball players
S.L. Benfica basketball players
Small forwards
Sporting CP basketball players